Strasbourg is the prefecture and largest city of the Grand Est region of eastern France and the official seat of the European Parliament. Located at the border with Germany in the historic region of Alsace, it is the prefecture of the Bas-Rhin department.

In 2020, the city proper had 290,576 inhabitants and both the Eurométropole de Strasbourg (Greater Strasbourg) and the Arrondissement of Strasbourg had 511,552 inhabitants. Strasbourg's metropolitan area had a population of 853,110 in 2019, making it the eighth-largest metro area in France and home to 14% of the Grand Est region's inhabitants. The transnational Eurodistrict Strasbourg-Ortenau had a population of roughly 1,000,000 in 2022. Strasbourg is one of the de facto four main capitals of the European Union (alongside Brussels, Luxembourg and Frankfurt), as it is the seat of several European institutions, such as the European Parliament, the Eurocorps and the European Ombudsman of the European Union. An organization separate from the European Union, the Council of Europe (with its European Court of Human Rights, its European Directorate for the Quality of Medicines most commonly known in French as "Pharmacopée Européenne", and its European Audiovisual Observatory) is also located in the city.

Together with Basel (Bank for International Settlements), Geneva (United Nations), The Hague (International Court of Justice) and New York City (United Nations world headquarters), Strasbourg is among the few cities in the world that is not a state capital that hosts international organisations of the first order. The city is the seat of many non-European international institutions such as the Central Commission for Navigation on the Rhine and the International Institute of Human Rights. It is the second city in France in terms of international congress and symposia, after Paris. Strasbourg's historic city centre, the Grande Île (Grand Island), was classified a World Heritage Site by UNESCO in 1988, with the newer "Neustadt" being added to the site in 2017. Strasbourg is immersed in Franco-German culture and although violently disputed throughout history, has been a cultural bridge between France and Germany for centuries, especially through the University of Strasbourg, currently the second-largest in France, and the coexistence of Catholic and Protestant culture. It is also home to the largest Islamic place of worship in France, the Strasbourg Grand Mosque.

Economically, Strasbourg is an important centre of manufacturing and engineering, as well as a hub of road, rail, and river transportation. The port of Strasbourg is the second-largest on the Rhine after Duisburg in Germany, and the second-largest river port in France after Paris.

Etymology and names
Until the fifth century CE, the city was known as Argantorati (in the nominative, Argantorate in the locative), a Celtic Gaulish name Latinised first as Argentorate (with Gaulish locative ending, as appearing on the first Roman milestones in the first century CE) and then as Argentoratum (with regular Latin nominative ending, in later Latin texts). That Gaulish name is a compound of -rati, the Gaulish word for fortified enclosures, cognate to the Old Irish ráth (see ringfort) and arganto(n)- (cognate to Latin argentum, which gave modern French argent), the Gaulish word for silver, but also any precious metal, particularly gold, suggesting either a fortified enclosure located by a river gold mining site, or hoarding gold mined in the nearby rivers.

After the fifth century CE the city became known by a completely different name, later Gallicized as Strasbourg (Lower Alsatian: Strossburi). That name is of Germanic origin and means 'town (at the crossing) of roads'. The modern Stras- is cognate with the German Straße and English street, both derived from Latin strata ("paved road"), while -bourg is cognate with the German Burg and English borough, both derived from Proto-Germanic *burgz ("hill fort, fortress").

Gregory of Tours was the first to mention the name change: in the tenth book of his History of the Franks written shortly after 590 he said that Egidius, Bishop of Reims, accused of plotting against King Childebert II of Austrasia in favor of his uncle King Chilperic I of Neustria, was tried by a synod of Austrasian bishops in Metz in November 590, found guilty and removed from the priesthood, then taken "ad Argentoratensem urbem, quam nunc Strateburgum vocant" ("to the city of Argentoratum, which they now call Strateburgus"), where he was exiled.

Geography

Location

Strasbourg is situated at the eastern border of France with Germany. This border is formed by the Rhine, which also forms the eastern border of the modern city, facing across the river to the German town Kehl. The natural courses of the two rivers eventually join some distance downstream of Strasbourg, although several artificial waterways now connect them within the city.

This section of the Rhine valley is a major axis of north–south travel, with river traffic on the Rhine itself, and major roads and railways paralleling it on both banks.

Climate
In spite of its position far inland, Strasbourg has an oceanic climate (Köppen: Cfb), though with less maritime influence than the milder climates of Western and Southern France. The city has warm, relatively sunny summers and cool, overcast winters. Precipitation is elevated from mid-spring to the end of summer, but remains largely constant throughout the year, totaling  annually. On average, snow falls 30 days per year.

This record was broken, on June 30, 2019, when it reached   and then on July 25, 2019, when it reached .

Strasbourg's location in the Rhine valley, sheltered from strong winds by the Vosges and Black Forest mountains, results in poor natural ventilation, making Strasbourg one of the most atmospherically polluted cities of France. Nonetheless, the progressive disappearance of heavy industry on both banks of the Rhine, as well as effective measures of traffic regulation in and around the city have reduced air pollution in recent years.

History

The Roman camp of Argentoratum was first mentioned in 12 BC; the city of Strasbourg which grew from it celebrated its 2,000th anniversary in 1988. The fertile area in the Upper Rhine Plain between the rivers Ill and Rhine had already been populated since the Middle Paleolithic.

Between 362 and 1262, Strasbourg was governed by the bishops of Strasbourg; their rule was reinforced in 873 and then more in 982. In 1262, the citizens violently rebelled against the bishop's rule (Battle of Hausbergen) and Strasbourg became a free imperial city. It became a French city in 1681, after the conquest of Alsace by the armies of Louis XIV. In 1871, after the Franco-Prussian War, the city became German again, until 1918 (end of World War I), when it reverted to France. After the defeat of France in 1940 (World War II), Strasbourg came under German control again through formal annexation into the Gau Baden-Elsaß under the Nazi Gauleiter Robert Wagner; since the end of 1944, it has again been a French city. In 2016, Strasbourg was promoted from capital of Alsace to capital of Grand Est.

Strasbourg played an important part in the Protestant Reformation, with personalities such as John Calvin, Martin Bucer, Wolfgang Capito, Matthew and Katharina Zell, but also in other aspects of Christianity such as German mysticism, with Johannes Tauler, Pietism, with Philipp Spener, and Reverence for Life, with Albert Schweitzer. Delegates from the city took part in the Protestation at Speyer. It was also one of the first centres of the printing industry with pioneers such as Johannes Gutenberg, Johannes Mentelin, and Heinrich Eggestein. Among the darkest periods in the city's long history were the years 1349 (Strasbourg massacre), 1518 (Dancing plague), 1793 (Reign of Terror), 1870 (Siege of Strasbourg) and the years 1940–1944 with the Nazi occupation (atrocities such as the Jewish skull collection) and the British and American bombing raids. Some other notable dates were the years 357 (Battle of Argentoratum), 842 (Oaths of Strasbourg), 1538 (establishment of the university), 1605 (world's first newspaper printed by Johann Carolus), 1792 (La Marseillaise), and 1889 (pancreatic origin of diabetes discovered by Minkowski and Von Mering).

Strasbourg has been the seat of European Institutions since 1949: first of the International Commission on Civil Status and of the Council of Europe, later of the European Parliament, of the European Science Foundation, of Eurocorps, and others as well.

Districts
Strasbourg is divided into the following districts:
 Bourse, Esplanade, Krutenau
 Centre Ville (Downtown Strasbourg)
 Gare, Tribunal (Central Station, Court)
 Conseil des XV, Orangerie
 Cronenbourg
 Hautepierre, Poteries
 Koenigshoffen,
 Montagne-Verte (Green Hill)
 Elsau
 Meinau
 Neudorf-Musau
 Neuhof 1 (including Ganzau)
 Neuhof 2
 Robertsau
 Port du Rhin (Rhin's Harbor)

Main sights

Architecture

The city is chiefly known for its sandstone Gothic Cathedral with its famous astronomical clock, and for its medieval cityscape of Rhineland black and white timber-framed buildings, particularly in the Petite France district or Gerberviertel ("tanners' district") alongside the Ill and in the streets and squares surrounding the cathedral, where the renowned Maison Kammerzell stands out.

Notable medieval streets include Rue Mercière, Rue des Dentelles, Rue du Bain aux Plantes, Rue des Juifs, Rue des Frères, Rue des Tonneliers, Rue du Maroquin, Rue des Charpentiers, Rue des Serruriers, Grand' Rue, Quai des Bateliers, Quai Saint-Nicolas and Quai Saint-Thomas.
Notable medieval squares include Place de la Cathédrale, Place du Marché Gayot, Place Saint-Étienne, Place du Marché aux Cochons de Lait and Place Benjamin Zix.

In addition to the cathedral, Strasbourg houses several other medieval churches that have survived the many wars and destructions that have plagued the city: the Romanesque Église Saint-Étienne, partly destroyed in 1944 by Allied bombing raids; the part-Romanesque, part-Gothic, very large Église Saint-Thomas with its Silbermann organ on which Wolfgang Amadeus Mozart and Albert Schweitzer played; the Gothic Église protestante Saint-Pierre-le-Jeune with its crypt dating back to the seventh century and its cloister partly from the eleventh century; the Gothic Église Saint-Guillaume with its fine early-Renaissance stained glass and furniture; the Gothic Église Saint-Jean; the part-Gothic, part-Art Nouveau Église Sainte-Madeleine etc. The Neo-Gothic church Saint-Pierre-le-Vieux Catholique (there is also an adjacent church Saint-Pierre-le-Vieux Protestant) serves as a shrine for several 15th-century wood-worked and painted altars coming from other, now destroyed churches and installed there for public display; especially the Passion of Christ. Among the numerous secular medieval buildings, the monumental Ancienne Douane (old custom-house) stands out.

The German Renaissance has bequeathed the city some noteworthy buildings (especially the current Chambre de commerce et d'industrie, former town hall, on Place Gutenberg), as did the French Baroque and Classicism with several hôtels particuliers (i.e. palaces), among which the Palais Rohan (completed 1742, used for university purposes from 1872 to 1895, now housing three museums) is the most spectacular. Other buildings of its kind are the "Hôtel de Hanau" (1736, now the city hall); the Hôtel de Klinglin (1736, now residence of the préfet); the Hôtel des Deux-Ponts (1755, now residence of the military governor); the Hôtel d'Andlau-Klinglin (1725, now seat of the administration of the Port autonome de Strasbourg) etc. The largest baroque building of Strasbourg though is the  1720s main building of the Hôpital civil.
As for French Neo-classicism, it is the Opera House on Place Broglie that most prestigiously represents this style.

Strasbourg also offers high-class eclecticist buildings in its very extended German district, the Neustadt, being the main memory of Wilhelmian architecture since most of the major cities in Germany proper suffered intensive damage during World War II. Streets, boulevards and avenues are homogeneous, surprisingly high (up to seven stories) and broad examples of German urban lay-out and of this architectural style that summons and mixes up five centuries of European architecture as well as Neo-Egyptian, Neo-Greek and Neo-Babylonian styles. The former imperial palace Palais du Rhin, the most political and thus heavily criticized of all German Strasbourg buildings epitomizes the grand scale and stylistic sturdiness of this period. But the two most handsome and ornate buildings of these times are the École internationale des Pontonniers (the former Höhere Mädchenschule, with its towers, turrets and multiple round and square angles and the Haute école des arts du Rhin with its lavishly ornate façade of painted bricks, woodwork and majolica.

Notable streets of the German district include: Avenue de la Forêt Noire, Avenue des Vosges, Avenue d'Alsace, Avenue de la Marseillaise, Avenue de la Liberté, Boulevard de la Victoire, Rue Sellénick, Rue du Général de Castelnau, Rue du Maréchal Foch, and Rue du Maréchal Joffre. Notable squares of the German district include Place de la République, Place de l'Université, Place Brant, and Place Arnold.

Impressive examples of Prussian military architecture of the 1880s can be found along the newly reopened Rue du Rempart, displaying large-scale fortifications among which the aptly named Kriegstor (war gate).

As for modern and contemporary architecture, Strasbourg possesses some fine Art Nouveau buildings (such as the huge Palais des Fêtes and houses and villas like Villa Schutzenberger and Hôtel Brion), good examples of post-World War II functional architecture (the Cité Rotterdam, for which Le Corbusier did not succeed in the architectural contest) and, in the very extended Quartier Européen, some spectacular administrative buildings of sometimes utterly large size, among which the European Court of Human Rights building by Richard Rogers is arguably the finest. Other noticeable contemporary buildings are the new Music school Cité de la Musique et de la Danse, the Musée d'Art moderne et contemporain and the Hôtel du Département facing it, as well as, in the outskirts, the tramway-station Hoenheim-Nord designed by Zaha Hadid.

The city has many bridges, including the medieval and four-towered Ponts Couverts that, despite their name, are no longer covered. Next to the Ponts Couverts is the Barrage Vauban, a part of Vauban's 17th-century fortifications, that does include a covered bridge. Other bridges are the ornate 19th-century Pont de la Fonderie (1893, stone) and Pont d'Auvergne (1892, iron), as well as architect Marc Mimram's futuristic Passerelle over the Rhine, opened in 2004.

The largest square at the centre of the city of Strasbourg is the Place Kléber. Located in the heart of the city's commercial area, it was named after general Jean-Baptiste Kléber, born in Strasbourg in 1753 and assassinated in 1800 in Cairo. In the square is a statue of Kléber, under which is a vault containing his remains. On the north side of the square is the Aubette (Orderly Room), built by Jacques François Blondel, architect of the king, in 1765–1772.

Parks

Strasbourg features a number of prominent parks, of which several are of cultural and historical interest: the Parc de l'Orangerie, laid out as a French garden by André le Nôtre and remodeled as an English garden on behalf of Joséphine de Beauharnais, now displaying noteworthy French gardens, a neo-classical castle and a small zoo; the Parc de la Citadelle, built around impressive remains of the 17th-century fortress erected close to the Rhine by Vauban; the Parc de Pourtalès, laid out in English style around a baroque castle (heavily restored in the 19th century) that now houses a small three-star hotel, and featuring an open-air museum of international contemporary sculpture.
The Jardin botanique de l'Université de Strasbourg (botanical garden) was created under the German administration next to the Observatory of Strasbourg, built in 1881, and still owns some greenhouses of those times. The Parc des Contades, although the oldest park of the city, was completely remodeled after World War II. The futuristic Parc des Poteries is an example of European park-conception in the late 1990s. The Jardin des deux Rives, spread over Strasbourg and Kehl on both sides of the Rhine opened in 2004 and is the most extended (60-hectare) park of the agglomeration. The most recent park is Parc du Heyritz (8,7 ha), opened in 2014 along a canal facing the hôpital civil.

Museums
As of 2020, the city of Strasbourg has eleven municipal museums (including Aubette 1928), eleven university museums, and at least two privately owned museums (Musée vodou and Musée du barreau de Strasbourg). Five communes in the metropolitan area also have museums (see below), three of them dedicated to military history.

Overview
The collections in Strasbourg are distributed over a wide range of museums, according to a system that takes into account not only the types and geographical provenances of the items, but also the epochs. This concerns in particular the following domains:
Old master paintings from the Germanic Rhenish territories and until 1681 are displayed in the Musée de l'Œuvre Notre-Dame (MOND); old master paintings from all the rest of Europe (including the Dutch Rhenish territories) and until 1871, as well as old master paintings from the Germanic Rhenish territories between 1681 and 1871, are displayed in the Musée des Beaux-Arts; paintings since 1871 are displayed in the Musée d'art moderne et contemporain (MAMCS).
Decorative arts until 1681 are on display in the MOND, decorative arts from the years 1681 until 1871 are on display in the Musée des arts décoratifs, decorative arts after 1871 are on display at the MAMCS, with items from each epoch also shown in the Musée historique.
Prints and drawings until 1871 are displayed in the Cabinet des estampes et dessins, save for the original plans of Strasbourg Cathedral, displayed in the MOND. Prints and drawings after 1871 are displayed in the MAMCS, and in the Musée Tomi Ungerer/Centre international de l'illustration (the combined number of prints and drawings amounts to well over 200,000).
Artefacts from Ancient Egypt are on display in two entirely different collections, one in the Musée archéologique and the other belonging to the Instituts d'Égyptologie et de Papyrologie of the University of Strasbourg.

Fine art museums

 The Musée des Beaux-Arts owns paintings by Hans Memling, Francisco de Goya, Tintoretto, Paolo Veronese, Giotto di Bondone, Sandro Botticelli, Peter Paul Rubens, Anthony van Dyck, El Greco, Correggio, Cima da Conegliano and Piero di Cosimo, among others.
 The Musée de l'Œuvre Notre-Dame (located in a part-Gothic, part-Renaissance building next to the cathedral) houses a large and renowned collection of medieval and Renaissance upper-Rhenish art, among which original sculptures, plans and stained glass from the cathedral and paintings by Hans Baldung and Sebastian Stoskopff.
 The Musée d'Art moderne et contemporain is among the largest museums of its kind in France.
 The Musée des Arts décoratifs, located in the sumptuous former residence of the cardinals of Rohan, the Palais Rohan displays a reputable collection of 18th century furniture and china.
 The Cabinet des estampes et des dessins displays five centuries of engravings and drawings, but also woodcuts and lithographies.
 The Musée Tomi Ungerer/Centre international de l'illustration, located in a large former villa next to the Theatre, displays original works by Ungerer and other artists (Saul Steinberg, Ronald Searle ... ) as well as Ungerer's large collection of ancient toys.

Other museums
 The Musée archéologique presents a large display of regional findings from the first ages of man to the sixth century, focusing on the Roman and Celtic period. It also includes a collection of works from Ancient Egypt and Ancient Greece, assembled and bequeathed by Gustave Schlumberger.
 The Musée alsacien is dedicated to traditional Alsatian daily life.
 Le Vaisseau ("The vessel") is a science and technology centre, especially designed for children.
 The Musée historique (historical museum) is dedicated to the tumultuous history of the city and displays many artifacts of the times, including the Grüselhorn, the horn that was blown at 10 every evening during medieval times to order the Jews out of the city.
 The Musée vodou (Voodoo museum) opened its doors on 28 November 2013. Displaying a private collection of artefacts from Haiti, it is located in a former water tower (château d'eau) built in 1883 and classified as a Monument historique.
 The Musée du barreau de Strasbourg (The Strasbourg bar association museum) is a museum dedicated to the work and the history of lawyers in the city.

University museums
The Université de Strasbourg is in charge of a number of permanent public displays of its collections of scientific artefacts and products of all kinds of exploration and research.
 The Musée zoologique is one of the oldest in France and is especially famous for its collection of birds. The museum is co-administrated by the municipality.
 The Gypsothèque (also known as Musée des moulages or Musée Adolf Michaelis) is France's second-largest cast collection and the largest university cast collection in France.
 The Musée de Sismologie et Magnétisme terrestre displays antique instruments of measure.
 The Musée Pasteur is a collection of medical curiosities.
 The Musée de minéralogie is dedicated to minerals.
 The Musée d'Égyptologie houses a collections of archaeological findings made in and brought from Egypt and Sudan. This collection is entirely separate from the Schlumberger collection of the Musée archéologique (see above).
 The Crypte aux étoiles ("star crypt") is situated in the vaulted basement below the Observatory of Strasbourg and displays old telescopes and other antique astronomical devices such as clocks and theodolites.

Museums in the suburbs
 Musée Les Secrets du Chocolat (Chocolate museum) in Geispolsheim
 Fort Frère in Oberhausbergen
 Fort Rapp in Reichstett
 Pixel Museum, a video game museum, in Schiltigheim
 MM Park France, a military museum, in La Wantzenau

Demographics

The commune of Strasbourg proper had a population of 290,576 on 1 January 2020, the result of a constant moderate annual growth which is also reflected in the constant growth of the number of students at its university (e. g. from 42,000 students in 2010 to 52,000 students in 2019). The metropolitan area of Strasbourg had a population of 853,110 inhabitants in 2019 (French side of the border only), while the transnational Eurodistrict had a population of 1,000,000 in 2022.

In the Middle Ages, Strasbourg (a Free imperial city since 1262), was an important town. According to a 1444 census, the population was circa 20,000; only one third less than Cologne, then a major European city.

Population growth

Population composition

Culture
Strasbourg is the seat of internationally renowned institutions of music and drama:
 The Orchestre philharmonique de Strasbourg, founded in 1855, one of the oldest symphonic orchestras in western Europe. Based since 1975 in the Palais de la musique et des congrès.
 The Opéra national du Rhin
 The Théâtre national de Strasbourg
 The Percussions de Strasbourg
 The Théâtre du Maillon
 The "Laiterie"
 Joshy's house - a venue for performance poetry and freestyle urban music.
 Au Zénith 
Other theatres are the Théâtre jeune public, the TAPS Scala, the Kafteur ...

Events
 Musica, international festival of contemporary classical music (autumn)
 Festival international de Strasbourg (founded in 1932), festival of classical music and jazz (summer)
 Festival des Artefacts, festival of contemporary non-classical music
 Les Nuits électroniques de l'Ososphère
 Strasbourg European Fantastic Film Festival is an annual film festival devoted to science fiction, horror and fantasy. It was known as the Spectre Film Festival before 2008.
Strasbulles is the annual comic con, also known as the European Festival of Bande Dessinée
 The Strasbourg International Film Festival is an annual film festival focusing on new and emerging independent filmmakers from around the world.
 Christkindelsmärik, held from the end of November through December, is an annual Christmas market that dates back to 1570.

Education

Universities and tertiary education
Strasbourg, well known as centre of humanism, has a long history of excellence in higher-education, at the crossroads of French and German intellectual traditions. Although Strasbourg had been annexed by the Kingdom of France in 1683, it still remained connected to the German-speaking intellectual world throughout the 18th century, and the university attracted numerous students from the Holy Roman Empire, with Goethe, Metternich and Montgelas, who studied law in Strasbourg, among the most prominent. With 19 Nobel prizes in total, Strasbourg is the most eminent French university outside of Paris.

Up until January 2009, there were three universities in Strasbourg, with an approximate total of 48,500 students  (another 4,500 students are being taught at one of the diverse post-graduate schools):

 Strasbourg I – Louis Pasteur University
 Strasbourg II – Marc Bloch University
 Strasbourg III – Robert Schuman University

As of 1 January 2009, those three universities have merged and now constitute the Université de Strasbourg.
Schools part of the Université de Strasbourg include:

 Sciences Po Strasbourg (Institut d'études politiques de Strasbourg), the University of Strasbourg's political science & international studies center
 The EMS (EM Strasbourg Business School), the University of Strasbourg's business school
 The INSA (Institut national des sciences appliquées), the University of Strasbourg's engineering school
 The ENA (École nationale d'administration). ENA trains most of the nation's high-ranking civil servants. The relocation to Strasbourg was meant to give a European vocation to the school and to implement the French government's "décentralisation" plan.
 The HEAR (Haute école des arts du Rhin) is an art school following the European tradition.
 The ISEG Group (Institut supérieur européen de gestion group)
 The ISU (International Space University) is located in the south of Strasbourg (Illkirch-Graffenstaden).
 The ECPM (École européenne de chimie, polymères et matériaux)
 The EPITA (École pour l'informatique et les techniques avancées)
 The EPITECH (École pour l'informatique et les nouvelles technologies)
 The INET (Institut national des études territoriales)
 The IIEF (Institut international d'études françaises)
 The ENGEES (École nationale du génie de l'eau et de l'environnement de Strasbourg)
 The CUEJ (Centre universitaire d'enseignement du journalisme)
 TÉLÉCOM Physique Strasbourg (École nationale supérieure de physique de Strasbourg), Institute of Technology, located in the South of Strasbourg (Illkirch-Graffenstaden)

Primary and secondary education
International schools include:

Multiple levels:
 European School of Strasbourg (priority given to children whose parents are employed at the European institutions)

For elementary education:
 École Internationale Robert Schuman
 International School at Lucie Berger
 Russian Mission School in Strasbourg

For middle school/junior high school education:
 Collège International de l'Esplanade

For senior high school/sixth form college:
 Lycée International des Pontonniers (FR)
 Lycée International Jean Sturm

Libraries

The Bibliothèque nationale et universitaire (BNU) is, with its collection of more than 3,000,000 titles, the second-largest library in France after the Bibliothèque nationale de France. It was founded by the German administration after the complete destruction of the previous municipal library in 1871 and holds the unique status of being simultaneously a students' and a national library. The Strasbourg municipal library had been marked erroneously as "City Hall" in a French commercial map, which had been captured and used by the German artillery to lay their guns. A librarian from Munich later pointed out "...that the destruction of the precious collection was not the fault of a German artillery officer, who used the French map, but of the slovenly and inaccurate scholarship of a Frenchman."

The municipal library Bibliothèque municipale de Strasbourg (BMS) administrates a network of ten medium-sized librairies in different areas of the town. A six stories high "Grande bibliothèque", the Médiathèque André Malraux, was inaugurated on 19 September 2008 and is considered the largest in Eastern France.

Incunabula
As one of the earliest centers of book-printing in Europe (see above: History), Strasbourg for a long time held a large number of incunabula — books printed before 1500 — in its library as one of its most precious heritages: no less than 7,000. After the total destruction of this institution in 1870, however, a new collection had to be reassembled from scratch. Today, Strasbourg's different public and institutional libraries again display a sizable total number of incunabula, distributed as follows: Bibliothèque nationale et universitaire, ca. 2,120, Médiathèque de la ville et de la communauté urbaine de Strasbourg, 349, Bibliothèque du Grand Séminaire, 238, Médiathèque protestante, 66, and Bibliothèque alsatique du Crédit Mutuel, 5.

Transport

Train services operate from the Gare de Strasbourg, the city's main station in the city centre, eastward to Offenburg and Karlsruhe in Germany, westward to Metz and Paris, and southward to Basel. Strasbourg's links with the rest of France have improved due to its recent connection to the TGV network, with the first phase of the TGV Est (Paris–Strasbourg) in 2007, the TGV Rhin-Rhône (Strasbourg-Lyon) in 2012, and the second phase of the TGV Est in July 2016.

Strasbourg also has its own airport, serving major domestic destinations as well as international destinations in Europe and northern Africa. The airport is linked to the Gare de Strasbourg by a frequent train service.

The CTS also operates a comprehensive bus network throughout the city that is integrated with the trams. The CTS, and its predecessors, also operated a previous generation of tram system between 1878 and 1960, complemented by trolleybus routes between 1939 and 1962.

Being on the Ill and close to the Rhine, Strasbourg has always been an important centre of fluvial navigation, as is attested by archeological findings. In 1682 the Canal de la Bruche was added to the river navigations, initially to provide transport for sandstone from quarries in the Vosges for use in the fortification of the city. That canal has since closed, but the subsequent Canal du Rhône au Rhin, Canal de la Marne au Rhin and Grand Canal d'Alsace are still in use, as is the important activity of the Port autonome de Strasbourg. Water tourism inside the city proper attracts hundreds of thousands of tourists yearly.

The tram system that now criss-crosses the historic city centre complements walking and biking in it. The centre has been transformed into a pedestrian priority zone that enables and invites walking and biking by making these active modes of transport comfortable, safe and enjoyable. These attributes are accomplished by applying the principle of "filtered permeability" to the existing irregular network of streets. It means that the network adaptations favour active transport and, selectively, "filter out" the car by reducing the number of streets that run through the centre. While certain streets are discontinuous for cars, they connect to a network of pedestrian and bike paths which permeate the entire centre. In addition, these paths go through public squares and open spaces increasing the enjoyment of the trip. This logic of filtering a mode of transport is fully expressed in a comprehensive model for laying out neighbourhoods and districts – the Fused Grid.

At present the A35 autoroute, which parallels the Rhine between Karlsruhe and Basel, and the A4 autoroute, which links Paris with Strasbourg, penetrate close to the centre of the city. The Grand contournement ouest (GCO) project, programmed since 1999, planned to construct a  highway connection between the junctions of the A4 and the A35 autoroutes in the north and of the A35 and A352 autoroutes in the south. This routes well to the west of the city in order to divest a significant portion of motorized traffic from the unité urbaine. The GCO project was opposed by environmentalists, who created a ZAD (or Zone to Defend). After much delay, the GCO was finally inaugurated on 11 December 2021.

Strasbourg Public Transport Statistics
The average amount of time people spend commuting on public transport in Strasbourg on weekdays is 52 min. 7% of travellers on public transport travel for more than 2 hours every day. The average amount of time people wait at a stop or station for public transport is 9 min and 11% of passengers wait for more than 20 minutes on average every day.

European role

Institutions

Strasbourg is the seat of over twenty international institutions, most famously of the Council of Europe and of the European Parliament, of which it is the official seat. Strasbourg is considered the legislative and democratic capital of the European Union, while Brussels is considered the executive and administrative capital and Luxembourg the judiciary and financial capital.

Strasbourg is the seat of the following organisations, among others:
 Central Commission for Navigation on the Rhine (since 1920)
 Council of Europe with all the bodies and organisations affiliated to this institution (since 1949)
 European Parliament (since 1952)
 European Ombudsman
 Eurocorps headquarters,
 Franco-German television channel Arte
 European Science Foundation
 International Institute of Human Rights
 Human Frontier Science Program
 International Commission on Civil Status
 Assembly of European Regions
 Centre for European Studies (French: Centre d'études européennes de Strasbourg)
 Sakharov Prize

Eurodistrict

France and Germany have created a Eurodistrict straddling the Rhine, combining the Greater Strasbourg and the Ortenau district of Baden-Württemberg, with some common administration. It was established in 2005 and has been fully functional since 2010.

Sports

Sporting teams from Strasbourg are the Racing Club de Strasbourg Alsace (football), SIG Strasbourg (basketball) and the Étoile Noire (ice hockey). The women's tennis Internationaux de Strasbourg is one of the most important French tournaments of its kind outside Roland-Garros. In 1922, Strasbourg was the venue for the XVI Grand Prix de l'A.C.F. which saw Fiat battle Bugatti, Ballot, Rolland Pilain, and Britain's Aston Martin and Sunbeam.

In 2006 Strasbourg hosted the Grand Depart of the Tour de France.

The city is home to SN Strasbourg, a First division water polo team that plays its home games at the Piscine de la Kibitzenau.

Honours
Honours associated with the city of Strasbourg.
 The Medal of Honor Strasbourg
 Sakharov Prize seated in Strasbourg
 City of Strasbourg Silver (gilt) Medal, a former medal with City Coat of Arms and Ten Arms of the Cities of the Dekapolis

Notable people 

In chronological order, notable people born in Strasbourg include: Eric of Friuli, Johannes Tauler, Sebastian Brant, Jean Baptiste Kléber, Louis Ramond de Carbonnières, François Christophe Kellermann, Marie Tussaud, Ludwig I of Bavaria, Charles Frédéric Gerhardt, Louis-Frédéric Schützenberger, Gustave Doré, Émile Waldteufel, René Beeh, Jean/Hans Arp, Charles Münch, Hans Bethe, Maurice Kriegel-Valrimont, Marcel Marceau, Tomi Ungerer, Elizabeth Sombart, Arsène Wenger, Petit and Matt Pokora.

In chronological order, notable residents of Strasbourg include: Johannes Gutenberg, Hans Baldung, Martin Bucer, John Calvin, Joachim Meyer, Johann Carolus, Johann Wolfgang Goethe, Jakob Michael Reinhold Lenz, Klemens Wenzel von Metternich, Georg Büchner, Louis Pasteur, Ferdinand Braun, Albrecht Kossel, Georg Simmel, Albert Schweitzer, Otto Klemperer, Marc Bloch, Alberto Fujimori, Marjane Satrapi, Paul Ricœur and Jean-Marie Lehn.

Twin towns and sister cities

Strasbourg is twinned with:
  Boston, United States, since 1960
  Leicester, United Kingdom, since 1960
  Stuttgart, Germany, since 1962
  Dresden, Germany, since 1990
  Ramat Gan, Israel, since 1991

Strasbourg has cooperative agreements with:
  Jacmel, Haiti, since 1991 (Coopération décentralisée)
  Fez, Morocco, since 1999 (Coopération décentralisée)
  Douala, Cameroon, since 2005 (Coopération décentralisée)
  Vologda, Russia, since 2009 (Coopération décentralisée)
  Oran, Algeria, since 2015 (Coopération décentralisée)
  Kairouan, Tunisia, since 2015 (Coopération décentralisée)
  Moscow, Russia, since 2016 (Coopération décentralisée)
  Kampala, Uganda, since 2018 (Coopération décentralisée)
  Kagoshima, Japan, since 2019 (Coopération décentralisée)

In popular culture

In film
 The opening scenes of the 1977 Ridley Scott film The Duellists take place in Strasbourg in 1800.
 The 2007 film In the City of Sylvia is set in Strasbourg.
 Early February 2011, principal photography for Sherlock Holmes: A Game of Shadows (2011) moved for two days to Strasbourg. Shooting took place on, around, and inside the Strasbourg Cathedral. The opening scene of the movie covers an assassination-bombing in the city.

In literature
 One of the longest chapters of Laurence Sterne's novel Tristram Shandy (1759–1767), "Slawkenbergius' tale", takes place in Strasbourg.
 An episode of Matthew Gregory Lewis' novel The Monk (1796) takes place in the forests then surrounding Strasbourg.
 A part of the story in White Album 2 takes place in Strasbourg.

In music
 Wolfgang Amadeus Mozart called his Third violin concerto (1775) Straßburger Konzert because of one of its most prominent motives, based on a local, minuet-like dance that had already appeared as a tune in a symphony by Carl Ditters von Dittersdorf. It is not related to Mozart's ulterior stay in Strasbourg (1778), where he gave three concert performances on the piano.
 Havergal Brian's Symphony No. 7 was inspired by passages in Goethe's memoirs recalling his time spent at Strasbourg University. The work ends with an orchestral bell sounding the note E, the strike-note of the bell of Strasbourg Cathedral. 
 British art-punk band The Rakes had a minor hit in 2005 with their song "Strasbourg". This song features witty lyrics with themes of espionage and vodka and includes a count of 'eins, zwei, drei, vier!!', even though Strasbourg's spoken language is French.
 On their 1974 album Hamburger Concerto, Dutch progressive band Focus included a track called "La Cathédrale de Strasbourg", which included chimes from a cathedral-like bell.
 Strasbourg pie, a dish containing foie gras, is mentioned in the finale of the Andrew Lloyd Webber musical Cats.
 Several works have specifically been dedicated to Strasbourg Cathedral, notably ad hoc compositions (masses, motets etc.) by Kapellmeisters Franz Xaver Richter and Ignaz Pleyel and, more recently, It is Finished by John Tavener.

Notes

References

Citations

Sources 

 Connaître Strasbourg by Roland Recht, Georges Foessel and Jean-Pierre Klein, 1988, .
 Histoire de Strasbourg des origines à nos jours, four volumes (ca. 2000 pages) by a collective of historians under the guidance of Georges Livet and Francis Rapp, 1982, .

External links 

 Strasbourg municipality website
 Tourist office of Strasbourg

 
Cities in France
Communes of Bas-Rhin
Former republics
Populated places on the Rhine
Prefectures in France
States and territories established in 1262
World Heritage Sites in France
Vauban fortifications in France